Undaunted or The Undaunted may refer to:

 The Undaunted (TV series), docudrama about Canada's founders, aired on CBC in 1983
 The Undaunted (1936 novel) by physician Alan L. Hart
 The Undaunted (2009 novel) by Gerald Lund, historical fiction of Mormon pioneers

See also
Undaunted - The Early Life of Josh McDowell (2011), a documentary
HMS Undaunted (British ships of that name)
USS Undaunted (American ships)